Greg Etafia (born 30 September 1982) is a Nigerian football goalkeeper who plays for South African Premier Soccer League club Highlands Park.

Career
Etafia played for Lobi Stars in the CAF Champions League and the Nigeria national under-23 football team which participated in the 2000 Summer Olympics.

Etafia played for Moroka Swallows in South Africa from 2003 until 2015.

He has also been a member of the Nigeria national football team.

Coaching career
A few weeks after retiring in the summer 2015, it was announced that Etafia would continue at Moroka Swallows, but as a goalkeeper coach. On 8 March 2016, Etafia was appointed caretaker manager of the club for the rest of the season.

On 21 September 2016, Etafia moved to Cape Town All Stars, accepting a goalkeeper coaching position. Two months later, at the end of October 2016, Etafia was appointed caretaker once again. In his time in charge, Etafia moved All Stars off the bottom of the standings to the first position of safety in 14th place, while guiding the club to the last 32 of the Nedbank Cup. In the beginning of January 2017, the club announced that he would continue as the club's manager. However, he left the club few days later.

In May 2017, he joined Baroka F.C. as a goalkeeper coach. He left the club one year later, May 2018, when a new coach arrived with his own technical staff.

Four years after retiring from playing football, Etafia signed with Highlands Park F.C. on 17 July 2019.

References

External links
 

1982 births
Living people
Sportspeople from Edo State
People from Auchi
Nigerian footballers
Nigeria international footballers
Nigerian expatriate footballers
Plateau United F.C. players
Expatriate soccer players in South Africa
Lobi Stars F.C. players
Nigerian expatriate sportspeople in South Africa
Association football goalkeepers
Moroka Swallows F.C. players
2004 African Cup of Nations players